Sverresborg Church is a parish church of the Church of Norway in Trondheim municipality in Trøndelag county, Norway. It is located in the Sverresborg neighborhood in the district of Byåsen in the city of Trondheim. It is one of the churches in the Sverresborg parish (the other is Havstein Church). The parish is part of the Heimdal og Byåsen prosti (deanery) in the Diocese of Nidaros. The wood church is clad with fiber cement siding and it was built in a modern, rectangular design in 2014 by the architect Stein Halvorsen.

History
The parish of Sverresborg was created in 1970 when it was separated from the large Byåsen Church parish. Initially, the parish of Sverresborg consisted of one church, Havstein Church. A second church was later needed for the parish, so in 2006 an architectural competition was held for the new church. It was won by Stein Halvorsen with a project called "With the sky as a roof". The building was consecrated on 7 September 2014.

See also
List of churches in Nidaros

References

Churches in Trondheim
Churches in Trøndelag
Rectangular churches in Norway
Concrete churches in Norway
21st-century Church of Norway church buildings
Churches completed in 2014
2014 establishments in Norway